Fortunato Libanori (14 June 1934 – 11 July 2006) was an Italian Grand Prix motorcycle road racer. His best year was in 1956 when he finished fifth in the 125cc world championship.

Motorcycle Grand Prix results

References 

1934 births
Sportspeople from Milan
2006 deaths
Italian motorcycle racers
125cc World Championship riders
250cc World Championship riders